Chinese thorn-apple is a common name for several flowering plants in the family Solanaceae and may refer to:

Datura ferox
Datura quercifolia, native to Mexico and the southwestern United States